Doğa Bekleriz (born 28 November 1977, Istanbul) is a Turkish model, actress, and TV presenter. She also started a singing career with a group named Adrenalin, formed with two other Turkish models, Gizem Özdilli and Nigar Talibova.

Biography

She made her first public appearances in 1996 and 1998, where she took part in two successive modelling competitions, organized by the Star TV and ATV TV channels respectively. She, since early 2005, has been modelling for brand-names in Turkey. She also played supporting roles in several TV series.

Filmography

 1998 - Aynalı Tahir (TV series)
 2001 - 90-60-90 (TV series)
 2002 - İki Arada (TV series)
 2005 - Kızma Birader (TV series)
 2007 - Amerikalılar Karadeniz'de

References

External links
 Hürriyet newspaper - Doğa Bekleriz photo gallery

1977 births
Living people
Turkish female models
Turkish film actresses
Turkish television actresses
Turkish pop singers
Actresses from Istanbul
Singers from Istanbul
21st-century Turkish singers
21st-century Turkish women singers